Andrew McQualter (born 9 June 1986) is an Australian rules footballer who played 89 games for the St Kilda Football Club in the Australian Football League (AFL). He was also on the Gold Coast Football Club rookie list. He is currently an assistant coach at the Richmond Football Club.

Early years and junior football
McQualter was raised in Traralgon, Victoria, and attended Gippsland Grammar School and later Caulfield Grammar School as a boarder along with future St Kilda teammate Brendon Goddard. McQualter and Goddard both captained the school's First XVIII football team and played in the First XI cricket side.

McQualter captained the Victorian Country Under-16 and Under-18 teams at the National Football Championships.

AFL career

St Kilda

McQualter debuted for St Kilda in Round 8 of the 2005 season against the West Coast Eagles at Subiaco in Perth, with 16 possessions. He averaged 13 possessions per game over seven senior games in the 2005 season. He appeared in 10 games in the 2006 season.

At the end of the 2007 season, McQualter had played 23 games, earning 137 kicks and 121 handballs, for a total of 258 disposals (an average of 11.2 possessions per game).

McQualter was officially delisted by the Saints at the end of the 2007 season, despite having another year to run on a two-year contract. He was reported as saying that he felt he had "stagnated" in his third year of football. He was then redrafted by the St Kilda Football Club onto the club's rookie list in the 2007 Draft and returned to the team.

McQualter began the 2008 season quietly on s rookie list, but began to turn in several solid performances with St Kilda's affiliate in the Victoria Football League (VFL). With his continued good form McQualter was temporarily elevated off the rookie list and selected to play against Sydney in Round 12. He cemented his place in the senior team after several tagging jobs and played nine consecutive games, a personal best for McQualter at the time. He played his first AFL final in the 2008 1st Qualifying Final against Geelong. McQualter was promoted back onto St Kilda's primary list at the end of the 2008 season.

McQualter played in 21 of 22 matches in the 2009 season in which St Kilda qualified in first position for the 2009 finals series, winning the club’s third minor premiership. St Kilda won through to the 2009 grand final after qualifying and preliminary final wins. McQualter played in the 2009 AFL Grand Final in which St Kilda were defeated by 12 points. McQualter averaged 14.4 possessions per game and kicked 22 goals in 24 matches during the 2009 season. As of the end of the 2009 season, McQualter had played in six finals matches, including one grand final.

McQualter played 25 games in 2010, including four finals matches. As of the end of the 2010 season, McQualter had played in 10 AFL finals matches, including three grand finals. He was delisted at the end of the 2011 season following the Saints' elimination final loss to the Sydney Swans.

Gold Coast Suns
McQualter joined the Gold Coast Suns' rookie list in 2012 and began playing in the Suns' North East Australian Football League reserves team. He was part of the Suns' leadership group and played in Round 8 of the AFL season.

Coaching career
McQualter joined Richmond in 2014, serving as a VFL player and development coach. He became a midfield assistant coach in 2016.

See also
 List of Caulfield Grammar School people

References

External links

Gold Coast Football Club profile

1986 births
Living people
St Kilda Football Club players
People educated at Caulfield Grammar School
Australian rules footballers from Victoria (Australia)
Gippsland Power players
Gold Coast Football Club players
Sandringham Football Club players
People from Traralgon